The Navarre tournament is the previous round of the Copa RFEF in Navarre. Organized by the Navarrese Football Federation, the Navarrese teams in Segunda División B and the best teams of the Tercera División (Group 3) not qualified to the Copa del Rey play this tournament, including farm teams.

It is usually played between July and October, and the champion of the tournament qualifies to the National tournament of the Copa RFEF.

Format
The Cup has been played since 2005, when the Navarrese group split from La Rioja. Played by the teams that did not qualify to Copa del Rey, the format depends on the number of registered teams.

The winner receives a €3,000 prize.

History

Source:

Champions

References

External links
Navarrese Football Federation

Football in Navarre
Navarre